The mayor of Valenzuela, a highly urbanized city in northern Metro Manila, Philippines, is the official head and chief executive of Valenzuela. He leads on enforcing city ordinances and improving public services. The mayor has a term of office of three years, but has a maximum electoral tenure of three consecutive terms. Inaugural holder of the office was Pío Valenzuela (1869–1956), served from 1899 to 1901, whom the city received its name.

During the Spanish colonial period, the town that composed of what is now Valenzuela, called before as Polo, was ruled by a gobernadorcillo appointed through an exclusive nomination provided by the Spanish law. Later in the American period, first mayor Pío Valenzuela was appointed as its first municipal president until his resignation in 1901. Since then, municipal presidents are elected by a popular vote.

The current 1987 Constitution of the Philippines and the City Charter of 1998 defined the position, powers and responsibilities of the mayor.

List of mayors

Town of Polo, Bulacan (1623–1899)

Municipality of Polo, Bulacan (1899–1960)

Division (1960–1963)

Municipality of Polo, Bulacan

Municipality of Valenzuela, Bulacan

Municipality of Valenzuela (1964–1998)

City of Valenzuela (since 1998)

Timeline

History of the city government
The following lists incorporate all people who became members of the city council. The city council is always headed by the city's Vice Mayor.

Summary of city council membership

Notes:
A: Ex-officio member, Association of Barangay Chairmen (ABC) president.
B: Ex-officio member, Sangguniang Kabataan (SK) Federation president.

City council, 2022–2025

City council, 2019–2022

City council, 2016–2019

City council, 2013–2016

City council, 2010–2013

City council, 2007–2010

City council, 2004–2007

City council, 2001–2004

Municipal council, 1998–2001

See also 
 Mayor of Manila

References 
 Past Mayors – Valenzuela USA

 
Valenzuela City
People from Valenzuela, Metro Manila
1899 establishments in the Philippines
Valenzuela